Juniperus indica, the black juniper, is a juniper native to high-altitude climates in the Himalaya, occurring in Pakistan, India, Nepal, Bhutan and China.

The leaves are borne in whorls of three on strong stout main stem shoots, and opposite pairs on thinner, slower-growing shoots. It is dioecious, with male (pollen) and female (seed) cones on separate plants. The mature seed cones are ovoid, berry-like, 6–10 mm long, glossy black, and contain a single seed; the seeds are dispersed by birds which eat the cones, digest the fleshy cone pulp, and excrete the seeds in their droppings.

References

 

indica
Flora of China
Flora of the Indian subcontinent
Least concern plants
Dioecious plants